The 2011 South Carolina Gamecocks baseball team represented the University of South Carolina in the 2011 NCAA Division I baseball season.  The Gamecocks played their home games in Carolina Stadium. The team was coached by Ray Tanner, who was in his fifteenth season at Carolina.  The Gamecocks won the 2011 College World Series to become the sixth school in the history of the College World Series to win consecutive national titles (1949-1950 Texas Longhorns; 1970-1974 Southern California Trojans; 1987-1988 Stanford Cardinal; 1996-1997 LSU Tigers; & the 2006-2007 Oregon State Beavers).

During their postseason run, the Gamecocks also became the first team to go 10-0 through the postseason.  Building on the success of the prior year's team, the Gamecocks set two NCAA records with consecutive post-season wins (16) and consecutive CWS wins (11); both streaks are active going into the 2012 season.

Personnel

Roster

2011 South Carolina Gamecocks Baseball Roster & Bios http://gamecocksonline.cstv.com/sports/m-basebl/mtt/scar-m-basebl-mtt.html

Coaching staff

2011 South Carolina Gamecocks Baseball Coaches & Bios http://gamecocksonline.cstv.com/sports/m-basebl/mtt/scar-m-basebl-mtt.html#coaches

Schedule

! style="background:#73000A;color:white;"| Regular Season (44–12)
|- valign="top" 

|- align="center" bgcolor="#ccffcc"
| 1 || February 18 || Santa Clara || Carolina Stadium || 12–5 || Roth (1–0) || Simon (0–1) || None ||8,242 || 1–0 || –
|- align="center" bgcolor="#ccffcc"
| 2 || February 19 || Santa Clara || Carolina Stadium || 2–1 || Webb (1-0) || Hall (0–1) || Price (1) || 8,242 || 2–0 ||–
|- align="center" bgcolor="#ccffcc"
| 3 || February 20 || Santa Clara || Carolina Stadium || 6–0 || Mata (1–0) || Mendoza (0–1) || None || 7,316 || 3–0 || –
|- align="center" bgcolor="#ccffcc"
| 4 || February 25 || Southern Illinois || Carolina Stadium || 10–6 || Roth (2–0) || Maldonado (0–2) || Price (2) || 6,935 || 4–0 ||–
|- align="center" bgcolor="#ccffcc"
| 5 || February 26 || Southern Illinois || Carolina Stadium || 4–0 || Webb (2–0) || Forsythe (1–1) || None || 7,911 || 5–0 ||–
|- align="center" bgcolor="#ccffcc"
| 6 || February 27 || Southern Illinois || Carolina Stadium || 9–4 || Taylor (1–0) || Eaton (1–1) || None || 7,141 || 6–0 ||–
|-

|- align="center" bgcolor="ccffcc"
| 7 || March 1 || Furman || Carolina Stadium || 14–1 || Neff (1–0) || Smith (0–2) ||None || 6,162 || 7–0 ||–
|- align="center" bgcolor="ccffcc"
| 8 || March 4 || Clemson || Carolina Stadium || 6–3 || Roth (3–0) || Weismann (2–1) || Price (3) || 8,242 || 8–0 ||–
|- align="center" bgcolor="bbbbbb"
| – || March 5 || vs. Clemson || Fluor Field || colspan=7 |Postponed
|- align="center" bgcolor="ffbbb"
| 9 || March 6 || @Clemson || Doug Kingsmore Stadium || 5–10 || Moorefield (1–0) || Price (0–1) || None || 6,320 || 8–1 ||–
|- align="center" bgcolor="ccffcc"
| 10 || March 8 || vs. Clemson || Fluor Field || 5–4 || Koumas (1–0) || Frederick (0–1) || Price (4) ||7,125 || 9–1 ||–
|- align="center" bgcolor="bbbbbb"
| – || March 9 || Davidson || Carolina Stadium || colspan=7 |Cancelled
|- align="center" bgcolor="ccffcc"
| 11 || March 11 || Cal State Bakersfield || Carolina Stadium || 5–1 || Roth (4–0) || McCarthy (1–2) || None || 6,505 || 10–1 ||–
|- align="center" bgcolor="ccffcc"
| 12 || March 12 || Cal State Bakersfield || Carolina Stadium || 5–2 || Neff (2–0) || Montoya (2–1) || None || 7,013 || 11–1 ||–
|- align="center" bgcolor="ffbbb"
| 13 || March 13 || Cal State Bakersfield || Carolina Stadium || 3–8 || Hoenshell (3–2) || Webb (2–1) || None || 7,128 || 11–2 ||–
|- align="center" bgcolor="ffbbb"
| 14 || March 15 || @Furman || Fluor Field || 2–4 || Stallsmith (2–1) || Westmoreland (0–1) || Cole (3) || 1,422 || 11–3 ||–
|- align="center" bgcolor="ccffcc"
| 15 || March 16 || Wofford || Carolina Stadium || 8–4 ||Holmes (1–0) || Eck (0–3) || None || 6,235 || 12–3 ||–
|- align="center" bgcolor="ffbbb"
| 16 || March 18 || Georgia || Carolina Stadium || 2–4 || Wood (2–2) || Roth (4–1) || Maloof (7) || 8,069 || 12–4 ||0–1
|- align="center" bgcolor="ccffcc"
| 17 || March 19 || Georgia || Carolina Stadium || 2–1 || Price (1–1) || Boling (0–1) || None || 8,105 || 13–4 ||1–1
|- align="center" bgcolor="ccffcc"
| 18 || March 20 || Georgia || Carolina Stadium || 8–3 || Koumas (2–0) || Herman (1–2) || Price (5) || 8,012 || 14–4 ||2–1
|- align="center" bgcolor="ccffcc"
| 19 || March 22 || College of Charleston || Carolina Stadium || 24–4 || Holmes (2–0) || Jeroszko (2–2) || None || 6,555 || 15–4 ||–
|- align="center" bgcolor="ccffcc"
| 20 || March 23 || Rhode Island || Carolina Stadium || 17–8 || Mata (2–0) || Bodjiak (2–1) || None  || 6,397 || 16–4 ||–
|- align="center" bgcolor="ccffcc"
| 21 || March 25 || @Florida || McKethan Stadium || 9–2 || Roth (5–1) || Johnson (4–1) || None || 5,586 || 17–4 ||3–1
|- align="center" bgcolor="ffbbb"
| 22 || March 26 || @Florida || McKethan Stadium || 1–2 || Randall (4–0) || Price (1–2) || None || 4,859 || 17–5 ||3–2
|- align="center" bgcolor="ccffcc"
| 23 || March 27 || @Florida || McKethan Stadium || 4–3 || Price (2–2) || Toledo (2–2) || None || 4,393 || 18–5 ||4–2
|- align="center" bgcolor="ccffcc"
| 24 || March 30 || The Citadel || Carolina Stadium || 6–4 || Taylor (2–0) || Cribb (0–1) || Price (6) || 6,227 || 19–5 ||–
|-

|- align="center" bgcolor="#ccffcc"
| 25 || April 1 || Kentucky || Carolina Stadium || 3–1 || Roth (6–1) || Meyer (3–4) || Price (7) || 7,063 || 20–5 || 5–2
|- align="center" bgcolor="#ccffcc"
| 26 || April 2 || Kentucky || Carolina Stadium || 4–310 || Price (3–2) || Gott (1–3) || None || 8,242 || 21–5 || 6–2
|- align="center" bgcolor="#ccffcc"
| 27 || April 3 || Kentucky || Carolina Stadium || 4–1 || Koumas (3–0) || Rogers (2–3) || Harper (1) || 7,513 || 22–5 || 7–2
|- align="center" bgcolor="#ccffcc"
| 28 || April 5 || USC Upstate || Carolina Stadium || 18–2 || Sullivan (1–0) || DeCecco (3–3) || None || 6,202 || 23–5 || –
|- align="center" bgcolor="#ccffcc"
| 29 || April 7 || @Tennessee || Lindsey Nelson Stadium || 4–0 || Roth (7–1) || Catapano (2–2) || Price (8) ||  3,435 || 24–5 || 8–2
|- align="center" bgcolor="#ccffcc"
| 30 || April 8 || @Tennessee || Lindsey Nelson Stadium || 2–0 || Holmes (3–0) || Gruver (3–4) || Price (9) || 2,070 || 25–5 || 9–2
|- align="center" bgcolor="#ccffcc"
| 31 || April 9 || @Tennessee || Lindsey Nelson Stadium || 2–1 || Koumas (4–0) || Watson (5–2) || Price (10) || 2,244 || 26–5 || 10–2
|- align="center" bgcolor="#ffbbb"
| 32 || April 12 || @The Citadel || Joe Riley Park || 0–2 || Cribb (1–1) || Neff (2–1) || Clarkson (1) || 5,032 || 26–6 || –
|- align="center" bgcolor="#ccffcc"
| 33 || April 15 || Vanderbilt || Carolina Stadium || 3–1 || Roth (8–1) || Gray (7–2) || Price (11) || 8,242 || 27–6 || 11–2
|- align="center" bgcolor="#ffbbb"
| 34 || April 16 || Vanderbilt || Carolina Stadium || 4–6 || Garvin (7–1) || Holmes (3–1) || Moore (8) || 8,242 || 27–7 || 11–3
|- align="center" bgcolor="#ccffcc"
| 35 || April 17 || Vanderbilt || Carolina Stadium || 5–3 || Price (4–2) || Clinard (1–1) || None || 8,242 || 28–7 || 12–3
|- align="center" bgcolor="#ccffcc"
| 36 || April 19 || @College of Charleston || Patriot's Point || 8–3 || Harper (1–0) || Zokan (0–1) || None || 1,719 || 29–7 || –
|- align="center" bgcolor="#ccffcc"
| 37 || April 22 || @Mississippi State || Dudy Noble Field || 8–2 || Roth (9–1) || Stratton (4–5) || None || 6,023 || 30–7 || 13–3
|- align="center" bgcolor="#ffbbb"
| 38 || April 23 || @Mississippi State || Dudy Noble Field || 3–5 || Pollorena (5–2) || Taylor (2–1) || Reed (7) || 5,971 || 30–8 || 13–4
|- align="center" bgcolor="#ccffcc"
| 39 || April 24 || @Mississippi State || Dudy Noble Field || 13–4 || Taylor (3–1) || Jones (2–5) || None || 5,821 || 31–8 || 14–4
|- align="center" bgcolor="#ccffcc"
| 40 || April 26 || Liberty || Carolina Stadium || 9–6 || Mata (3–0) || Baker (5–3) || Price (12) || 6,404 || 32–8 || –
|- align="center" bgcolor="#ccffcc"
| 41 || April 29 || Auburn || Carolina Stadium || 2–1 || Taylor (4–1) || Ortman (0–1) || None || 8,016 || 33–8 || 15–4
|- align="center" bgcolor="#ccffcc"
| 42 || April 30 || Auburn || Carolina Stadium || 10–2 || Holmes (4–1) || Varnadore (4–2) || None || 8,242 || 34–8 || 16–4
|-

|- align="center" bgcolor="ccffcc"
| 43 || May 1 || Auburn || Carolina Stadium || 7–3 || Koumas (5–0) || Luckie (1–2) || Price (13) || 8,020 || 35–8 || 17–4
|- align="center" bgcolor="ccffcc"
| 44 || May 4 || @Wofford|| King Field || 9–3 || Westmoreland (1–1) || Sheridan (1–4) || None || 2,118 || 36–8 || –
|- align="center" bgcolor="ccffcc"
| 45 || May 6 || @Ole Miss || Swayze Field || 6–1 || Roth (10–1) || Crouse (6–4) || None || 8,121 || 37–8 || 18–4
|- align="center" bgcolor="ffbbb"
| 46 || May 7 || @Ole Miss || Swayze Field || 2–10 || Goforth (4–6) || Holmes (4–2) || None || 8,046 || 37–9 || 18–5
|- align="center" bgcolor="ffbbb"
| 47 || May 8 || @Ole Miss || Swayze Field || 6–7 || Morgan (3–0) || Price (4–3) || None || 8,332 || 37–10 || 18–6
|- align="center" bgcolor="ccffcc"
| 48 || May 10 || Presbyterian || Carolina Stadium || 6–1 || Neff (3–1) || Jeter (5–6) || None || 6,575 || 38–10 || –
|- align="center" bgcolor="ccffcc"
| 49 || May 11 || Charleston Southern || Carolina Stadium || 11-1 || Sullivan (2-0) || Mauldin (0-4) || None || 6,516 || 39–10 || –
|- align="center" bgcolor="ffbbb"
| 50 || May 13 || Arkansas || Carolina Stadium || 2–6 || Baxendale (8–1) || Roth (10–2) || Daniel (2) || 7,672 || 39–11 || 18–7
|- align="center" bgcolor="ccffcc"
| 51 || May 14 || Arkansas || Carolina Stadium || 6–5 || Price (5–3) || Stanek (2–2) || None || 7,765 || 40–11 || 19–7
|- align="center" bgcolor="ccffcc"
| 52 || May 15 || Arkansas || Carolina Stadium || 7–1 || Holmes (5–2) || Lynch (4–3) || None || 8,142 || 41–11 || 20–7
|- align="center" bgcolor="ccffcc"
| 53 || May 17 || UNC Asheville || Carolina Stadium || 9–5 || Webb (3–1) || Ricker (1–2) || None || 7,116 || 42–11 || –
|- align="center" bgcolor="ffbbb"
| 54 || May 19 || @Alabama || Sewell-Thomas Stadium || 1–2 || Kilcrease (6–4) || Roth (10–3) || None || 3,523 || 42–12 || 20–8
|- align="center" bgcolor="ccffcc"
| 55 || May 20 || @Alabama || Sewell-Thomas Stadium || 6–3 || Koumas (6–0) || Morgan (5–5) || Price (14) || 3,945 || 43–12 || 21–8
|- align="center" bgcolor="ccffcc"
| 56 || May 21 || @Alabama || Sewell-Thomas Stadium || 3–2 || Holmes (6–2) || Smart (4–2) || Price (15) || 3,764 || 44–12 || 22–8
|-

|-
! style="background:#73000A;color:white;"| Post-Season
|-

|- align="center" bgcolor="#ccffcc"
| 57 || May 25 ||  Auburn || Regions Park || 7–3 || Roth (11–3) || Jacobs (1–5) || None || 8,814 || 45–12 || 1–0
|- align="center" bgcolor="#ffbbb"
| 58 || May 26 ||  Vanderbilt|| Regions Park || 2–7 || Gray (10–3) || Koumas (6–1) || Moore (10) || 7,123 || 45–13 || 1–1
|- align="center" bgcolor="#ffbbb"
| 59 || May 27 ||  Georgia|| Regions Park || 2–4 || Dieterich (3–3) || Holmes (6–3) || Maloof (17) || 8,068 || 45–14 || 1–2
|-

|- align="center" bgcolor="#ccffcc"
| 60 || June 3 || Georgia Southern || Carolina Stadium || 2–1 || Roth (12–3) || Moye (7–2) || Price (16) || 8,091 || 46–14|| 1–0
|- align="center" bgcolor="#ccffcc"
| 61 || June 4 || Stetson || Carolina Stadium || 11–5 || Holmes (7–3) || Dorsey (7–6) || None || 7,335 || 47–14|| 2–0
|- align="center" bgcolor="#ccffcc"
| 62 || June 5 || Stetson || Carolina Stadium || 8–2 || Taylor (5–1) || Perez (2–3) || Price (17) || 6,718 || 48–14 || 3–0
|-

|- align="center" bgcolor="#ccffcc"
| 63 || June 10 || Connecticut || Carolina Stadium || 5–1 || Roth (13–3) || Barnes (11–5) || None || 8,242 || 49–14 || 4–0
|- align="center" bgcolor="#ccffcc"
| 64 || June 11 || Connecticut || Carolina Stadium || 8–2 || Taylor (6–1) || Nappo (10–3) || Price (18) || 8,242 || 50–14 || 5–0
|-

|- align="center" bgcolor="#ccffcc"
| 65 || June 19 || Texas A&M || TD Ameritrade Park|| 5–4 || Price (6–3) || Martin (2–3) || None || 23,395 || 51–14 || 6–0
|- align="center" bgcolor="#ccffcc"
| 66 || June 21 || Virginia || TD Ameritrade Park || 7–1 || Taylor (7–1) || Roberts (11–2) || None || 22,027 || 52–14 || 7–0
|- align="center" bgcolor="#ccffcc"
| 67 || June 24 || Virginia || TD Ameritrade Park || 3–213 || Price (7–3) || Winiarski (6–4) || None || 25,882 || 53–14 || 8–0
|- align="center" bgcolor="#ccffcc"
| 68 || June 27 || Florida || TD Ameritrade Park || 2–111 || Taylor (8–1) || Maronde (0–1) || Price (19) || 25,851 || 54–14 || 9–0
|- align="center" bgcolor="#ccffcc"
| 69 || June 28 || Florida || TD Ameritrade Park || 5–2 || Roth (14–3) || Whitson (8–1) || Price (20) || 26,721 || 55–14 || 10–0
|-

2011 South Carolina Gamecocks Baseball Schedule http://gamecocksonline.cstv.com/sports/m-basebl/sched/scar-m-basebl-sched.html

Honors and awards
 Forrest Koumas was named SEC Co-Freshman of the Week on April 4.
 Colby Holmes was named SEC Pitcher of the Week on April 11 and May 16.
 Michael Roth was named SEC Pitcher of the Week on April 18.
 Christian Walker was named SEC Player of the Week on April 25.
 Matt Price, Michael Roth and Scott Wingo were named First-Team All-SEC, Christian Walker was named Second-Team All-SEC, and Forrest Koumas was named Freshman All-SEC.
 Head coach Ray Tanner was named SEC Coach of the Year.
 Michael Roth was named CoSIDA First Team Academic All-American.
 Michael Roth was named to the SEC All-Tournament Team.
 Michael Roth was named Louisville Slugger Third-Team All-American.
 Robert Beary was named MVP of the NCAA Columbia Regional. Christian Walker, Scott Wingo, Adrian Morales, Evan Marzilli, and Michael Roth were also named to the All-Tournament team.
 Robert Beary (C), Peter Mooney (SS), Matt Price (P), Michael Roth (P), Brady Thomas (DH), Christian Walker (1B) and Scott Wingo (2B) were named to the College World Series All-Tournament Team.
 Scott Wingo was named Most Outstanding Player of the 2011 College World Series.

Rankings

NR = Not Ranked

Gamecocks in the 2011 MLB Draft
The following members of the South Carolina Gamecocks baseball program were drafted in the 2011 Major League Baseball Draft.

References

South Carolina Gamecocks
South Carolina Gamecocks baseball seasons
NCAA Division I Baseball Championship seasons
College World Series seasons
South Carolina
South